Volleyball at the 1988 Summer Olympics was represented by two events: men's team and women's team.

Medal table

Medal summary

References

External links
Volleyball
Official Olympic Report

 
1988 Summer Olympics events
O
1988